Mercy is the second and final full-length album by the Burden Brothers which was released on October 31, 2006 by Kirtland Records.

The album was released 2 weeks earlier, on October 17, in digital format on iTunes and other download sites.

Track listing 
Track listing and times come from Allmusic
 "It's Time" – 1:52
 "Shine" – 3:27
 "Still" – 4:13
 "Everybody Is Easy (We Sink/We Swim)" – 3:58
 "She's Not Home" – 3:43
 "Life Between" – 3:29
 "Trick of Logic" – 4:13
 "Good Night from Chicago" – 3:57
 "I Am a Cancer" – 4:57
 "Daughter of Science" – 4:04
 "Mercy" – 1:14
 "In My Sky" – 3:43
 "On Our Own" – 3:00
 "Oh, Cecilia" – 4:26
 "Liberated" – 6:07
 "Suffragette City" – 3:34
 iTunes exclusive

Charts

Single

Personnel 
 Vaden Todd Lewis - vocals, guitar
 Taz Bentley - vocals, drums
 Casey Hess - vocals, guitar
 Corey Rozzoni - guitar
 Zack Busby - vocals, electric bass

References 

Burden Brothers albums
2006 albums
Kirtland Records albums
Albums produced by Joe Chiccarelli
Albums produced by David Castell